Michael D. Marlar (born January 30, 1978) is an American professional dirt track and stock car racing driver. Marlar is the 2018 World of Outlaws Late Model Series champion. He has also competed in the NASCAR Cup, Xfinity, and Camping World Truck Series.

Racing career

Dirt racing

Marlar won 2018 World of Outlaws Championship by 28 points over Brandon Sheppard. Marlar won 5 feature events on the season.

Marlar won the 2020 Butterball Memorial at Richmond Raceway in Kentucky and the associated $20,000 payday.

Stock car racing
He made his NASCAR Gander Outdoors Truck Series debut at the 2019 Eldora Dirt Derby driving the No. 33 Toyota Tundra for Reaume Brothers Racing. Upon arriving at the track, Marlar was forced to remove the logos for his sponsor Marathon Oil off his truck, as it conflicted with Sunoco being the official fuel of NASCAR. He qualified for the main event by finishing fifth in the third qualifying race. He started in the 23rd position and finished fourth in the main event.

In September 2019, he joined MBM Motorsports for his NASCAR Xfinity Series debut at Richmond Raceway. He spun on the first lap and suffered terminal damage that resulted in a last-place finish.

In March 2021, Marlar returned to MBM to make his NASCAR Cup Series debut in the dirt race at Bristol Motor Speedway. He also joined Hill Motorsports to run the supporting Truck event. In the Truck race, he was involved in a late crash with Kyle Larson. Marlar's maiden Cup start ended after completing 244 of 253 laps due to a spin and he finished 31st.

Motorsports career results

NASCAR
(key) (Bold – Pole position awarded by qualifying time. Italics – Pole position earned by points standings or practice time. * – Most laps led.)

Cup Series

Xfinity Series

Camping World Truck Series

References

External links
 

Living people
1978 births
NASCAR drivers
Racing drivers from Tennessee